Guide to the Galaxy may refer to:

The Hitchhiker's Guide to the Galaxy, science fiction comedy series
Geek's Guide to the Galaxy, podcast focusing on fantasy & science fiction